Illumination is an album by the jazz pianist Walter Davis Jr.

Track listing
Scorpio Rising	
 Illumination	
 Ronnie's a Dynamite Lady
Backgammon	
Abide with Me	
Crowded Elevator	
Theme from "La Strada"
Biribinya Nos States	
Just One of Those Things
Pranayama	
 I'll Keep Loving You

Personnel
Walter Davis (piano)
Carter Jefferson (tenor saxophone)
Charles Sullivan (trumpet)
Jeremy Steig (flute)
Buster Williams (bass)
Bruno Carr (drums)
Art Blakey (drums)
Tony Williams (drums)
Naná Vasconcelos (percussion, track 8)
Milton Frustino (guitar, track 8)

References

Walter Davis Jr. albums
Denon Records albums
Pony Canyon albums
1977 albums
Instrumental albums